Lycka is a 1970 album released by folk/rock duo Björn Ulvaeus & Benny Andersson, who later became the male half of ABBA. Most of the songs feature lead vocals by Björn. The songs show the influence of Brian Wilson, "Ticket to Ride"-era Beatles and traditional Swedish folk music.

Lycka was produced by Björn and Benny with Bengt Bernhag and engineered by Michael B. Tretow. Benny and Björn played on the tracks with two Swiss musicians, drummer John Counz and bassist Gus Horn. Sven-Olof Walldoff was responsible for the orchestral arrangements, and on the 2006 re-release a few bonus tracks were added, notably early recordings with the two-girl half of the future group ABBA on backing vocals, Anni-Frid Lyngstad who was engaged to Benny Andersson and Agnetha Fältskog who was married to Björn Ulvaeus. Three years later, Ring Ring became the first proper album release of what would become the most famous Swedish pop band ever (though the original album did not use ABBA as the main name of the group).

Track listing

Note - Björn and Benny's most recent hit "Tänk om jorden vore ung" was added to the start of Side A when the album was reissued in 1972.

Personnel 
 Benny Andersson - piano, keyboards, vocals
 Björn Ulvaeus - guitars, vocals

Additional musicians

 Gus Horn - bass guitar
 John Cuonz - drums
 Agnetha Fältskog - backing vocals
 Anni-Frid Lyngstad - backing vocals

Production
 Benny Andersson, Björn Ulvaeus, Bengt Bernhag - producers
 Benny Andersson, Björn Ulvaeus, Sven-Olof Walldoff - arrangements
 Michael B. Tretow - engineer

2006 re-issue track listing
The 2006 re-release contained the following additional tracks:
 "She's My Kind of Girl" [Written for the Swedish movie Inga II: The Seduction of Inga, 1971]
 "Inga Theme" [From the motion picture Inga II: The Seduction of Inga, 1971]
 "Det kan ingen doktor hjälpa" ("It Can't Be Helped by a Doctor") [with Agnetha Fältskog & Anni-Frid Lyngstad backing vocals]
 "På bröllop" [with Agnetha Fältskog & Anni-Frid Lyngstad backing vocals]
 "Tänk om jorden vore ung" ("If Only We Had The Time") [with Agnetha Fältskog & Anni-Frid Lyngstad backing vocals]
 "Träskofolket" ("The Clog People")
 "En karusell" ("Merry-Go-Round") [with Agnetha Fältskog & Anni-Frid Lyngstad backing vocals]
 "Att finnas till" ("To Exist")
 "Hey, Musikant" (German version of "Hej gamle man!") [with Agnetha Fältskog & Anni-Frid Lyngstad backing vocals]
 "Was die Liebe sagt" (German version of "Livet går sin gång")
 "Love Has Its Ways"
 "Rock 'n Roll Band" (Björn & Benny's version)
 "Merry Go Round" (Björn & Benny's version) [with Agnetha Fältskog & Anni-Frid Lyngstad backing vocals]
 "To Live With You" (English version of "Lycka" recorded in 1975 and first released in 2006)

See also
ABBA
1970 in music

1970 debut albums
Benny Andersson albums
Björn Ulvaeus albums
Swedish-language albums
Collaborative albums
Polar Music albums